Kalamunda Senior High School is a  public co-educational high day school, located in the Perth suburb of Kalamunda, Western Australia.

Kalamunda Senior High School offers enrolment for students from Year 7 to Year 12.

See also

 List of schools in the Perth metropolitan area

References

External links 
 http://www.kalamundashs.wa.edu.au/

Public high schools in Perth, Western Australia
Educational institutions established in 1960
1960 establishments in Australia